Rajender Singh Yadav is a Member of Rajasthan Legislative Assembly from Kotputli constituency. Yadav is Minister of Motor Garage, Language and Social Justice. In the 2018 Rajasthan Legislative Assembly election he won over Indian National Congress ticket with margin of 13,876 votes.

Family background 
Rajendra Singh Yadav was born to Mr. Ramjilal Yadav 
.

Ministry
 Higher Education (Independent Charge)
 Planning (Manpower) (Independent Charge)
 State Motor Garage (Independent Charge)
 Language & Library (Independent Charge)
 Home & Justice

References

Indian National Congress politicians from Rajasthan
Rajasthan MLAs 2018–2023
Living people
Year of birth missing (living people)
People from Jaipur district